Kristin Marcell is a Republican member of the Pennsylvania House of Representatives, representing the 178th District since 2023.

External links

References 

Living people
Republican Party members of the Pennsylvania House of Representatives
21st-century American politicians
Year of birth missing (living people)